11th Congress may refer to:

11th Congress of the Philippines (1998–2001)
11th Congress of the Russian Communist Party (Bolsheviks) (1922)
11th National Congress of the Chinese Communist Party (1977)
11th National Congress of the Communist Party of Vietnam (2011)
11th National Congress of the Kuomintang (1976)
11th National Congress of the Lao People's Revolutionary Party (2021)
11th National People's Congress (2008–2013)
11th United States Congress (1809–1811)